Laline Paull is a British novelist. Her debut novel, The Bees, was nominated for the 2015 Baileys Women's Prize for Fiction. Her 2017 cli-fi novel is titled The Ice.

Biography 
Laline Paull was born in London, UK. She is the daughter of Indian immigrants. She won a scholarship to the University of Oxford.

Bibliography 
 2014 — The Bees
 2017 — The Ice
 2022 — Pod

References

External links
 

Living people
21st-century British novelists
21st-century British women writers
British women novelists
Writers from London
British people of Indian descent
Alumni of the University of Oxford
Year of birth missing (living people)